Eric Scott Patterson (born April 8, 1983) is an American former professional baseball left fielder and second baseman. Patterson made his MLB debut with the Chicago Cubs on August 6, 2007. He was the head coach of the Gwinnett Tides in the Sunbelt Baseball League. Patterson is currently the assistant hitting coach for the South Bend Cubs.

Baseball career

Georgia Tech
Although Patterson originally was drafted by the Colorado Rockies in the 23rd round of the 2001 MLB draft out of Harrison High School in Kennesaw, Georgia, he did not sign and went on instead to attend the Georgia Institute of Technology. With the Yellow Jackets, Patterson was named an Atlantic Coast Conference All-Star three times (2002–2004) and an All-American twice (in 2002 on the Freshman 1st Team, and in 2004 on the 3rd team). He was named to the USA Baseball team twice, in 2002 and 2003.

Chicago Cubs
Patterson was selected in the 8th round of the 2004 MLB draft by the Chicago Cubs.

Patterson played in the 2006 All-Star Futures Game in Pittsburgh, and was ranked the sixth-best prospect in the Cubs organization by Baseball America prior to the 2007 season. He collected his first major league hit on August 7, by singling against Woody Williams in a game against the Houston Astros. On June 22, 2008, Patterson hit the first home run of his career.

Oakland Athletics
On July 8, 2008, Patterson was traded along with pitcher Sean Gallagher, outfielder Matt Murton, and catcher Josh Donaldson to the Oakland Athletics for pitchers Rich Harden and Chad Gaudin.

On June 22, 2010, Patterson was designated for assignment to make way for Coco Crisp on the A's roster.

Boston Red Sox
On June 26, 2010, Patterson was traded to the Boston Red Sox for pitcher Fabian Williamson, after Dustin Pedroia was placed on the disabled list having sustained a nondisplaced fracture of the navicular bone on his left foot. He played a career-high 90 games in 2010, split equally between Oakland and Boston.

San Diego Padres
On December 16, Patterson was traded to the San Diego Padres to complete the deal that sent Adrián González to the Boston Red Sox for Casey Kelly, Anthony Rizzo, and Reymond Fuentes. He was designated for assignment on June 9. He was released by San Diego on December 15, 2011.

Detroit Tigers
Patterson signed a minor league contract with the Detroit Tigers on January 4, 2012.

York Revolution
Patterson played for the York Revolution of the Atlantic League of Professional Baseball.

Milwaukee Brewers
On July 12, 2013 The Milwaukee Brewers signed Patterson and assigned him to their Triple A team Nashville Sounds.

Chicago White Sox
Patterson signed a minor league deal with the Chicago White Sox in January 2014. He was released in March.

York Revolution
Patterson signed with the York Revolution of the Atlantic League of Professional Baseball for the 2015 season. He became a free agent after the 2015 season.

Personal life
Patterson's older brother—Corey, also drafted by the Cubs—is also an outfielder in MLB. His father, Don, was a defensive back for two years in the National Football League (NFL).

References

External links

1983 births
Living people
Águilas Cibaeñas players
American expatriate baseball players in the Dominican Republic
African-American baseball players
Baseball players at the 2003 Pan American Games
Baseball players from Tallahassee, Florida
Boston Red Sox players
Chicago Cubs players
Georgia Tech Yellow Jackets baseball players
Huntsville Stars players
Iowa Cubs players
Lake Elsinore Storm players
Major League Baseball left fielders
Major League Baseball second basemen
Mesa Solar Sox players
Oakland Athletics players
Pan American Games medalists in baseball
Pan American Games silver medalists for the United States
Pawtucket Red Sox players
Peoria Chiefs players
Sacramento River Cats players
San Diego Padres players
Tucson Padres players
Toledo Mud Hens players
United States national baseball team players
West Tennessee Diamond Jaxx players
York Revolution players
Medalists at the 2003 Pan American Games
21st-century African-American sportspeople
20th-century African-American people